Events from the year 1739 in Canada.

Incumbents
French Monarch: Louis XV
British and Irish Monarch: George II

Governors
Governor General of New France: Charles de la Boische, Marquis de Beauharnois
Colonial Governor of Louisiana: Jean-Baptiste Le Moyne de Bienville
Governor of Nova Scotia: Lawrence Armstrong
Commodore-Governor of Newfoundland: Henry Medley

Events
 Joseph La France begins to explore between Lake Superior and Hudson Bay.
 Census of New France counts 42,801 inhabitants

Births
 February 23: Jean-François Hubert, bishop of Quebec (d. 1797)
 August: Alexander Henry the elder, fur trader, merchant, militia officer, jp, and author (d. 1824)

Deaths
 May 19: Marie Barbier de l'Assomption, sister of the Congrégation de Notre-Dame (born 1663)

Full date unknown 
 Thomas Bird, Hudson's Bay Company chief at Albany Fort

Historical documents
After trouble trading with French, Joseph La France canoes from Sault Ste. Marie to York Factory with scores of beaver pelts

J.P. Aulneau's mother learns that Sioux who killed him have been defeated so often that they have sued for peace (Note: "savages" used)

Lengthy rationale for greater settlement of Nova Scotia comprises fishery, naval stores, agriculture and French threat

Spain having committed "depredations" and "many cruelties and barbarities" to British without compensation, letters of marque are to be issued

Of more than £250,000 owed Britain by Spain for ships illegally taken, £8,000 is for five ships from Newfoundland (perhaps among others)

Governors of Nova Scotia, Newfoundland and 13 other colonies (plus leader of Georgia) notified of King's declaration of war against Spain

Nova Scotia governor details province's military assets, which are much weaker than on neighbouring Île-Royale (and Acadie and Canada)

President of N.S. Council says Annapolis Royal vulnerable to French capture because fort weak and troops mostly raw and undisciplined

Board of Trade member offers plan of forces to use for Spanish Caribbean expedition, including "old soldiers" from Nova Scotia regiment

Canso's 9 or 10 resident families build/maintain stages for and give support to 70 summer visitors from New England (Piscataway to Falmouth)

French fishery off Nova Scotia described in great detail, including use of province's Atlantic shore (prohibited to British fishers)

Nova Scotia lieutenant governor Lawrence Armstrong commits suicide after "a long time frequently Afflicted with Melancholy fitts"

Lt. Gov. Clarke of New York says people fear war with Spain will bring in France, and urges defence build-up and presents for Six Nations

"A rupture with France is mentioned in the newspapers as a thing we are to expect" - N.Y. Assembly votes money for extensive defence works

Clarke says that though French claim all land in Great Lakes watershed, boundary through Lakes is more than they can expect

Clarke says "peopling" of country north of Saratoga with recently arrived British families will strengthen frontier and trade

Clarke warns of need to resist French settlement of property between Crown Point and Albany long since purchased from Indigenous people

Governor of Canada insists on claim to Great Lakes watershed, but gifts local claim near Crown Point to "Mohawks and his own Indians"

New Hampshire lieutenant governor warns of province's "very defenceless condition," including fort that can't even keep cattle out

Arthur Dobbs thinks discovery of Northwest Passage might make possible intercepting Spain's Acapulco ships from California to Panama

References

 
Canada
39